The Knight of the Black Sword (Italian: Il cavaliere dalla spada ) is a 1956 Italian historical adventure film directed by  and Luigi Capuano and starring Marina Berti, Steve Barclay and Otello Toso.

The film's sets were designed by Alfredo Montori.

Cast

References

Bibliography
 Roberto Chiti & Roberto Poppi. Dizionario del cinema italiano. Gremese Editore, 1991.

External links

1956 films
1950s historical adventure films
Italian historical adventure films
1950s Italian-language films
Films directed by Ladislao Kish
Films directed by Luigi Capuano
1950s Italian films